"Hang On to Yourself" is a song written by English singer-songwriter David Bowie in 1971 and released as a single with his band Arnold Corns. A re-recorded version, recorded in November 1971 at Trident Studios in London, was released on the album The Rise and Fall of Ziggy Stardust and the Spiders from Mars. The main riff is representative of glam rock's influence as a bridge between 1950s rock and roll, specifically rockabilly, and the punk to come; it draws on rockabilly influences such as Eddie Cochran, in a way that would influence punk records such as "Teenage Lobotomy" by Ramones.

Arnold Corns version
The Arnold Corns version of "Hang On to Yourself"—recorded at the Radio Luxembourg studios in London on 25 February 1971—was first released by B&C as the B-side to the single "Moonage Daydream" in the UK on 7 May 1971. On 11 August 1972, it was released again, this time as an A-side, by B&C.

 "Hang On to Yourself" – 2:55
 "The Man in the Middle" – 4:20

The Arnold Corns version was a bonus track on the 1990 Rykodisc/EMI remastering of Bowie's album The Man Who Sold the World. In 2002, this version appeared on the bonus disc of the Ziggy Stardust album's 30th Anniversary 2-CD reissue, and in 2015 it was included on Re:Call 1, part of the Five Years (1969–1973) boxed set.

The official band line-up, fronted by dress designer Freddi Buretti, was a total fabrication; Buretti was at the session but his contributions were simply lost alongside Bowie's.

Personnel
Arnold Corns version

Personnel per Kevin Cann.
 David Bowie – vocals, piano
 Mark Carr-Pritchard – guitar
 Peter DeSomogyi – bass
 Tim Broadbent – drums, tambourine

Ziggy Stardust version

Personnel per Kevin Cann.

David Bowie – vocals, acoustic guitar
Mick Ronson – lead guitar
Trevor Bolder – bass guitar
Mick "Woody" Woodmansey – drums

Other releases
 The Portuguese version of the single "Starman" from  also had "Hang On to Yourself" as the B-side.
 In  the Ziggy Stardust version was also released as the B-side of the US release of the single "The Jean Genie".
 It was released as a picture disc in the RCA Life Time picture disc set.
 It also appeared on the Japanese compilation The Best of David Bowie (1974).

Live versions
Both of these versions were released on the Bowie at the Beeb album in 2000.
This version also appeared on the Japanese release of Rarestonebowie and on the official 2008 release of that concert as Live Santa Monica '72.
 The version played at the famous "last concert" at the Hammersmith Odeon, London, was released on Ziggy Stardust: The Motion Picture.
 Performances from the Isolar II Tour were released on Stage (1978) and Welcome to the Blackout (2018).
 A November 2003 live performance from the A Reality Tour was released on the A Reality Tour DVD in 2004, and is included on the A Reality Tour album, released in 2010.

Cultural influences
The opening bars of Hang On To Yourself have been cited as the influence for Okuda Hiroko's "Rock" rhythm and bass preset backing track included in the Casio MT-40 and subsequently used as the basis of nearly 500 subsequent compositions, by artists as diverse as Wayne Smith, 2 Live Crew, and Moby.

References

Sources

David Bowie songs
1971 songs
1972 singles
Songs written by David Bowie
Song recordings produced by Ken Scott
Song recordings produced by David Bowie
Protopunk songs